Kannada films of 2010
Kannada films of 2011
Kannada films of 2012
Kannada films of 2013
Kannada films of 2014
Kannada films of 2015
Kannada films of 2016
Kannada films of 2017
Kannada films of 2018
Kannada films of 2019

2010s
Kannada-language
Films, Kannada